Sposato (Italian: married) (pron. spo ' sà ' to) is an Italian surname.  Peter Sposato (Harrison NY) is a prominent figure with this last name.

Variants
Sposaro.

Origins

The surname is mostly found in Calabria and a high concentration of inhabitants called Sposaro are located in the Province of Cosenza.

Celebrities

 Joe Sposato (born 1949), American former racing driver
 Nicholas Sposato, alderman of the 38th Ward of the City of Chicago Council
 Timothy J Sposato, Chief Mechanical Officer at Age of Steam Roundhouse.
 Steven Michael Sposato Songwriter. Wrote the song “Monki”.

Note

External links
L'Italia dei cognomi Gens.labo.net
Dissemination of the surname Sposato in Calabria 
Sposato on locatemyname.com

Surnames of Italian origin